Labergement-Sainte-Marie station is a railway station in the commune of Labergement-Sainte-Marie, in the French department of Doubs, in the Bourgogne-Franche-Comté region. It is an intermediate stop on the Dijon–Vallorbe line of SNCF.

Services
The following services stop at Labergement-Sainte-Marie:

References

External links 
 
 

Railway stations in Doubs